The Needles is a formation off the westernmost point of the Isle of Wight in the United Kingdom.

The Needles or Needles may also refer to:

Places

United States
 The Needles (Arizona), a group of mountain peaks in the Mohave Mountains of Arizona
 Needles, California, a city named after the peaks
 The Needles (Sequoia National Forest), a series of massive granite rock formations in California
 Needles (Black Hills), granite pillars in South Dakota
 The Needles district, the southeast section of Canyonlands National Park, Utah
 The Needles, a rocky area within Canyonlands National Park, Utah
 The Needles (Olympic Mountains), summits in Olympic National Park of Washington state
 The Needles (Washington), a mountain in the North Cascades range of Washington state

Elsewhere
 Needles, Tasmania, a locality in Australia
 Needles, British Columbia, Canada, an unincorporated area

Songs
 "Needles", by Adema on the album Unstable
 "Needles", by System of a Down on the album Toxicity
 "Needles", by Seether on the albums Disclaimer and Disclaimer II

Other uses
 Needles (surname)
 The Needles (band), a Scottish four-piece band originating in the late 1990s
 Needles (horse) (1953–1984), American Hall of Fame Champion Thoroughbred racehorse
 Needles (Amtrak station), a train station in Needles, California, United States
 Needles Ferry, a ferry between Needles and Fauquier, British Columbia, Canada
 The Needles, nickname for Project West Ford, a 1960s American military operation which put a series of communication dipoles in space
 Needles, a Back to the Future character

See also
 Needle (disambiguation)